Eugenie Carys de Silva is an academic known for being the youngest person to ever graduate from Harvard University. De Silva completed her masters in Intelligence Studies at age 13.

She previously served as Adjunct Faculty at Walters State Community College and now currently serves as senior consultant at Booz Allen Hamilton.

Early life and education 
de Silva was born in Manchester, England and was raised by her father, a Sri Lankan-born Physics and Chemistry Professor. She began high school at age 9 and graduated from the University of Missouri High School at the age of 11.

She graduated with a Bachelor's Degree in Intelligence Analysis (summa cum laude) from the American Military University at 11 years old and completed a Master's Degree in Intelligence Studies from the Harvard University at 13 years old, the youngest ever to do so. She also holds a Master's Degree in Intelligence Studies from the American Military University.

At the age of 15, de Silva completed a Doctor of Philosophy in Politics from the University of Leicester, the youngest to do so.

She later earned Master of Philosophy in Education, Globalization, & International Development from Faculty of Education at University of Cambridge. She also served as a member of Churchill College, Cambridge where she has acted as the internal social secretary for the graduate students.

Awards and recognition 
At the age of 7, de Silva won the Virginia State Award from Johns Hopkins University.

In 2014, she was featured as one of the 30 Thinkers Under 30 by the Pacific Standard Magazine.

In 2015, she won the Luce Leader Award, the youngest ever to do so.

References 

1998 births
Living people
Alumni of the University of Leicester
Harvard Extension School alumni
Alumni of the University of Cambridge
Alumni of Churchill College, Cambridge
British people of Sri Lankan descent
Harvard University alumni
Booz Allen Hamilton people